The 2006 Yanjin earthquake occurred with a moment magnitude of 4.9 on July 22 at 01:10 UTC (09:10 local time). This destructive shock took place in Yanjin County, Yunnan, China. Twenty-two were killed and 106 were injured.

Damage

Eight people were killed as a result of houses (usually wooden) collapsing and fourteen were killed from other reasons.

See also
List of earthquakes in 2006
List of earthquakes in China

References

2006 Yanjin
Yanjin
Yanjin earthquake
July 2006 events in China
Geography of Zhaotong